William Tait was a New Zealand cricketer. He played three first-class matches for Otago between 1872 and 1875.

See also
 List of Otago representative cricketers

References

External links
 

Year of birth missing
Year of death missing
New Zealand cricketers
Otago cricketers
Place of birth missing